Highland Home is an unincorporated community in Crenshaw County, Alabama, United States. Highland Home has a post office with ZIP code 36041, which opened on July 15, 1837. Located mostly on highway 331 that also runs to Luverne, Alabama.

References

Unincorporated communities in Crenshaw County, Alabama
Unincorporated communities in Alabama